AMU Literary Festival is an annual literary festival organised by Aligarh Muslim University. University Debating and Literary Club (UDLC) formerly University Literary Club of the university organises the festival. Some of the previous invitees include news anchor and author Rajdeep Sardesai, poet Keki N. Daruwalla, politician Mani Shankar Aiyar and independent journalist Rana Ayyub.

Organisation
The festival is organized under the auspices of the University Literary and Debating Club of the Aligarh Muslim University. The club consists of students as its members. The festival is the University Debating and Literary Club's flagship event.

Journalists like Rajdeep Sardesai talking about media, activists such as Paranjoy Guha Thakurta talking about crony capitalism and novelists like Chandrahas Choudhury having panel discussions about the Indian novel; the festival is a diverse celebration of literature and mass communication, in all its forms.

The festival attracts audience from all across the city, transcending the boundary of the university. Previous invitees include the poet Keki N. Daruwalla, politician Mani Shankar Aiyar and independent journalist Rana Ayyub. With people from diverse areas coming together and talking about the issues of the day and age, the festival is truly a melting pot of culture. Workshops to teach students about the ins and outs of various forms of writing and public speaking are also conducted as a part of the festival, which rounds out the educational experience.

The University Literary Club was established in 1973. The club is the extension of the oldest literary Society of AMU, the "Muhammadan Anglo-Oriental College Literary Society" founded by Sir Syed Ahmad Khan himself. The University Literary Club was rechristened as University Debating and Literary Club in 2015.

Past festivals

Lit Fest 2019 
The festival was organised from 8–10 March 2019.

Day 1, March 8, 2019

Inaugural lecture by Mr. Siddhart Varadarajan on Under Siege- The Media and the Idea of a University. He talked about the media as well as educational institutions becoming besieged by certain forces, giving examples of controversies in universities like AMU, JNU, etc. He also mentioned how social media has become a space to target the dissenters.
Panel discussion on The Relevance of Literary Festivals by Mrs. Jaishree Misra, Mr. Jerry Pinto and Prof. Shafey Kidwai, moderated by Ms. Alisha Ibkar. Mr. Jerry pinto highlighted the importance of reading for the survival of democracy. Misra and Kidwai both talked about literary festivals as the sites of self exploration and revolution.
Story telling and Recitation by Syed Asghar Wajahat.
The day ended with a cultural evening with the Secretary, President and Coordinator of CEC managing the event.

Day 2, March 9, 2019
There were a lot of panel discussions-

Reading Literature in the Age of 140 characters by Mr. Jerry Pinto, Dr. Nafis Faizi and Mr. Md. Danish Iqbal, moderated by Mr. Kashif Ilyas. The discussion was centred around the condition of literature in this age of extremities, and how instant gratification on social media and the shortening attention span of people has impacted literature.

Book Launch and Discussion on the book Lynch Files by Mr. Ziya Us Salam, moderated by Mr. Fawaz Shaheen. Mr. Ziya Us Salam talked about how murders in the past used to happen on religious grounds, but now lynchings are more of a conspiracy of targeting a particular person.

Ground(ed) Report in the Digital Scape by Mr.Mahtab Alam, Mr. Shoaib Daniyal, Mr. Gulam Jeelani, moderated by Prof. Mohammad Sajjad. The panelists talked about the problems faced by journalists in the digital era of reporting. There were also discussions about how difficult it is to report on communal violence. The issue of fake news was an important point.

Majoritarianism: The Undoing of Democracy by Mr. Ziya Us Salam, Mr. Shoaib Daniyal and Prof. Asmer Beg, moderated by Dr. Tarushikha Sarvesh. The major topics of discussion were minority issues, communal violence, safety of women, etc.

Conversation on Mothering a Muslim by Ms. Nazia Erum. The book focuses on Muslim women,  especially Muslim mothers, a group which, she said, has little representation in Indian literature. Professor Ayesha Munira was the other panelist.

The last event of the day was Zabaan-Daraaz by the University Drama Club.

Day 3, March 10, 2019

There were two panel discussions-

Urdu Novel ka Badalta Manzarnamah by Mr. Rahman Abbas, Prof. Shafey Kidwai and Prof. Tariq Chhatari, moderated by Prof. Siraj Ajmali. They talked about the rising position of the Urdu language in Indian popular culture. Where short stories have made a comeback, the Urdu novel still hasn't found its place.

Literature and Resistance: Rethinking the Politics of Literature by Dr. Shah Alam Khan, Prof. Apoorvanand, Mr. Manoj Jha and Mr. Harsh Mander, moderated by Dr. Irfanullah Faarooqui. The discussion revolved around the way literature has become a medium of dissent over the years, and how, in the current socio-political scenario, writers have to be careful with their words.

Poetry session by Dr. Sukrita Kumar and Dr. Rekha Sethi.
Lecture on Journalism in the Age of Muscular Nationalism by Mrs. Sagarika Ghose. The lecture was about the crude tactics of criminal intimidation that the government has adopted lately.
Talk by Mr. Saurabh Dwivedi on Main aur Musalman, Aapbeeti, Jagbeeti. He talked about the stark difference he felt in his life as a journalist, after spending his childhood in a place with communal harmony.
Session on Aks-e-Yusuf by Mr. Mohammad Sabeeh Bukhari, Mr Nadim Mahir and Prof. Shafey Kidwai.

At the end there was a tribute to Ankit Chadha & Dastan-e-Tamanna-e-Sarfaroshi, and the LitFest 2019 concluded with a qawwali by the Folk and Traditional Music Club of Aligarh Muslim University.

 List of Guests in 2019

Lit Fest 2018 
The festival was organised from 9–11 March 2018.

Day 1, 9 March 2018

Sankarshan Thakur declared the LitFest open with his inaugural lecture on 'The Necessity of Speaking'. 
 DastanGoi: Tilism-e-Hoshruba was performed by Meera Rizvi and Syed Shadab Hussain. directed by Mahmood Farooqui and produced by Anusha Rizvi.

Day 2, 10 March 2018

Panel discussion on Urdu Zubaan o Adab ka Haal aur Mustaqbil by Sanjeev Saraf. Dr. Siraj Ajmali was the moderator.
Poetry recitation by UDLC members with Sudhanshu Firdaus.
There was also a book reading session-
An Ordinary Man's Guide to Radicalism by Neyaz Faarooqui

Clouds by Chandrahas Choudury

A panel discussion on The Case/Curse of Caste in India with Prof. Satish Deshpande and Shuddhabrata Sen Gupta. The session was moderated by Md. Danish Iqbal.
Another panel discussion on Populism in the age of Conspicuous Consumption involving Mukul Kesavan, Prof. Saugata Bhaduri and Kalpana Sharma, moderated by Riad Azam.
Muzamil Jaleel, deputy editor of Indian Express gave a lecture.
There were numerous other panel discussions-

Ghalib ke Khatoot & Faiz and Alys Faiz's Letters presented by Impresario Asia, Shamir Abadan, Mannu Kohli and K.K Kohli.

Day 3, 11 March 2018

Life Imitating Literature or Literature Imitating Life: A Debate in the Context of Identities- Chandrahas Chaudhury Akhilesh, Prof. Asim Siddiqui. Moderator- Dr. Irfanullah Farooqi

Disabled Literature: Creative Writing, Pedagogy and Politics of Disability Representation- Dr. Hemchandran Karah, Dr. Jyothsna Phanija, Boopathi P. Moderator- Alisha Ibkar

People as Numbers: Re-engaging with Politics and Democracy in India- Prof. Apoorvanand Jha, chaired by Prof. Mirza Asmer Beg

There was also a book reading session by Farah Naqvi, as well as a poetry recitation session.
The last event was The Art of Storytelling by Neelesh Misra.
 List of Guests in 2018

Lit Fest 2017 
The festival was organised from 3–5 March 2017.

 List of Guests in 2017

Literary Festival (2016) 

 List of Guests

Literary Festival 2015 

 List of guests

See also
 Literary festival
 List of literary festivals in India

References 

Literary festivals in India
Aligarh Muslim University
2015 establishments in Uttar Pradesh
Festivals established in 2015